DXDX (693 AM) Radyo Ronda is a radio station owned and operated by the Radio Philippines Network. The station's studio is located along P. Acharon Blvd., Brgy. Dadiangas West, General Santos.

References

Radio stations in General Santos
Radio stations established in 1961
Radio Philippines Network
RPN News and Public Affairs
News and talk radio stations in the Philippines